{{DISPLAYTITLE:C14H12}}
The molecular formula C14H12 (molar mass : 180.25 g/mol) may refer to:

 9,10-Dihydroanthracene
 Stilbenes
(E)-Stilbene
(Z)-Stilbene
 1,1-Diphenylethylene
 Octalene
 Heptafulvalene